5 Temmuz Stadium is a multi-purpose stadium in İskenderun, Turkey.  It is currently used mostly for football matches and is the home ground of Turkish teams Körfez İskenderunspor and İskenderunspor 1967.

The stadium was built in 1961 and currently holds 12,390 people.

With the promotion of Payas Belediyespor to the Turkish TFF Third League at the 2013 season, the stadium became their home ground too.

References

External links
5 Temmuz
Soccerway

Football venues in Turkey
Multi-purpose stadiums in Turkey
Buildings and structures in Hatay Province
Sports venues completed in 1961